Unterems is an electoral constituency (German: Wahlkreis) represented in the Bundestag. It elects one member via first-past-the-post voting. Under the current constituency numbering system, it is designated as constituency 25. It is located in northwestern Lower Saxony, comprising the district of Leer and the northern part of the district of Emsland.

Unterems was created for the 1980 federal election. Since 2002, it has been represented by Gitta Connemann of the Christian Democratic Union (CDU).

Geography
Unterems is located in northwestern Lower Saxony. As of the 2021 federal election, it comprises the entirety of the district of Leer and the northern part of the district of Emsland, specifically the municipalities of Haren, Papenburg, Rhede, and Twist and the Samtgemeinden of Dörpen, Lathen, Nordhümmling, Sögel, and Werlte.

History
Unterems was created in 1980 and contained parts of the abolished constituencies of Emden – Leer and Emsland. Originally, it was constituency 20 in the number system. From the 2002 through 2009 elections, it was constituency 26. Since the 2013 election, it has been constituency 25. Its borders have not changed since its creation.

Members
The constituency has been held by the Christian Democratic Union (CDU) since its creation. Its first representative was Rudolf Seiters, who served from 1980 to 2002. Since 2002, it has been represented by Gitta Connemann.

Election results

2021 election

2017 election

2013 election

2009 election

Notes

References

Federal electoral districts in Lower Saxony
1980 establishments in West Germany
Constituencies established in 1980